A tower house is a tall fortified dwelling similar to the keep of a castle. See
 Tower houses in Britain and Ireland
 Welsh Tower houses
 Tower houses in the Balkans

Tower House may also refer to:
 The tower of a tower castle
 Tower House (film), 1962 Hindi language film
 The Tower House,  Holland Park, London, England
 Tower House, Leeds, now renamed Tower North Central
 Tower House, Brighton, East Sussex, England
 Tower House School, Richmond upon Thames, London, England
 Tower House, beside God's House Tower, Southampton, England
 The Tower House, Lubenham, Leicestershire, England
 Horatio Tower House, Worcester, Massachusetts, USA
 Lewis Tower House, Cumberland, Rhode Island, USA
 Tower House (Alexandria, Virginia), USA
 Tower House (Tokyo), Japan

See also
 Tower castle
 Peel tower